Aleksandr Vladimirovich Nagorny (born 11 September 1982) is a Russian football manager and a former player. He is an assistant coach for FC Ufa.

External links
 

1982 births
People from Kalmykia
Living people
Russian footballers
Russian football managers
Association football midfielders
Sportspeople from Kalmykia